Orlin Orlinov Pavlov (born April 23, 1979) (Bulgarian Cyrillic: Орлин Орлинов Павлов) is a Bulgarian singer and actor.

Music and Acting Career

In 2002 Orlin Pavlov was invited to become the lead singer of the pop group Kaffe. Kaffe was the first Bulgarian band to represent the country in the 2005 Eurovision Song Contest in Kyiv, Ukraine with the song Lorraine which ranked 19th with the total of 49 points respectively.

In 2006, Orlin Pavlov started his solo career with the song "Dream on", followed by numerous collaborations with Bulgarian singers, composers and producers.

He was participating in Dancing With The Stars in 2008, and Vip Brother in 2012, where he won both reality formats. In 2010, he was also the host of one of the daily shows in Pro BG TV.

In 2009, he was selected to be a juror in VIP Dance Bulgaria. In 2015 Orlin Pavlov was also in the jury of the Eurovision Junior Song Contest, which was held in Bulgaria for the first time.

His 2014 US Tour was a success which included the cities of Chicago, Los Angeles, Las Vegas, New York, Kape Code and Atlanta.

In 2016, he participated in the third reality format of the Bulgarian version of Your Face Sounds Familiar, where celebrity contestants impersonate famous singers.

In addition to his singing career, Orlin Pavlov also have a career in acting.

He played in the BTV’s comedy series "House Arrest" (Bulgarian: Домашен арест), the Nova TV’s series "Reward" (Bulgarian: Отплата).

In 2014 he played the leading role in Nikolay Iliev's movie "Living Legends" (Bulgarian: Живи Легенди).

In 2016 Orlin Pavlov was the voice-over of the leading character Max, in the Disney movie "The Secret Life of Pets" (Bulgarian: Тайният живот на домашните любимци).

In 2017 he also was the voice-over of the Beast in the Disney movie "Beauty and the Beast" (Bulgarian: Красавицата и Звяра).

References

External links
 https://m.facebook.com/orlinopavlov?refsrc=http%3A%2F%2Fwww.google.com%2F

1979 births
Living people
Bulgarian pop singers
21st-century Bulgarian male actors
Musicians from Sofia
Bulgarian male film actors